A denticle is any small tooth-like or bristle-like structure. "Denticle" may refer to:

 Denticle (tooth feature), serrations on the teeth of dinosaurs, lizards, sharks, and mammals
 Dermal denticles or placoid scales, in cartilaginous fishes
 Pulp stone or endolith, a calcified mass in the pulp of a tooth

See also
Denticulation (architecture)